Coll is an island located west of the Isle of Mull in the Inner Hebrides of Scotland. Coll is known for its sandy beaches, which rise to form large sand dunes, for its corncrakes, and for Breacachadh Castle. It is in the council area of Argyll and Bute.

Geology 
Coll is formed largely from gneiss forming the Lewisian complex, a suite of metamorphic rocks of Archaean to early Proterozoic age.
The eastern part of the island is traversed by numerous normal faults most of which run broadly northwest-southeast.  Dolerite and camptonite dykes of Permo-Carboniferous or Tertiary age are also seen in the east of the island. 
Quaternary sediments include raised beach deposits which are frequent around Coll’s coastline whilst stretches of alluvium occupy some low inland areas. There are considerable areas of blown sand in the west and along stretches of the north coast and of peat southwest from Arinagour.

Geography 
Coll's sandy beaches rise to form large sand dunes. The highest point on Coll is Ben Hogh in the mid-west of the island, which is a ridge with two tops running northwest to southeast.

Settlements
Arinagour, is the main settlement on the island located at the head of Loch Eatharna, on the east coast. Other inhabited locations include:
Cornaigmore
Crossapol, located on the south-west coast.
Grishipoll
Sorisdale

Etymology
Coll is sometimes derived from Gaelic coll, 'hazel'. However, the name is given as Colosus in the Life of St Columba by Adamnán, the seventh century abbot of Iona. As /s/ between vowels had been lost in Celtic before Adamnán's time, Watson suggests that Colosus may represent a pre-Celtic name. Richard Coates has proposed that the name may be related to Greek kolossós and may have referred to a humanoid standing stone located on the island, like those still seen on North Uist and Lewis. As Kolossós is not originally a Greek word, Coates suggests that the name could have been given to Coll at a time when the kolossói of Mediterranean culture were well-known, or named "by speakers of a language in which the ancestor of the word was the native term." In Icelandic, the word kollur (Old Norse: kollr, Norwegian: koll or kolle) means "a rounded protrusion, such as a rounded mountaintop, or a tussock".

History

Early history

In the 6th century, an Irish invasion led to the establishment of the Gaelic kingdom of Dál Riata, which included Coll. Dál Riata was divided into four kin-groups, of which the Cenél Loairn ruled Coll, Mull, and the adjacent mainland, which together consequently became known as Lorn, after them. Coll shared the history of Lorn for the next 1000 years, becoming part of the Kingdom of the Isles under Norwegian dominion, then the MacDougall subdivision of that kingdom after Somerled.

Coll, like other Hebridean islands, has several crannógs (artificial islands) located in some of its lochs, dating from this early period. It is difficult to estimate the exact age of these islands, but several are thought to date to the Norse period; local traditions describe three - Dùn Anlaimh, Dùn an Achaidh, Dùn Dubh - as having been Norse strongholds which survived until they were attacked by the Macleans.

The 1266 Treaty of Perth transferred the Norwegian crown dependency to the Scottish king. Following the MacDougall defeat in the dispute between king John Balliol and Robert de Bruys (they had backed the former), the position of sheriff of Argyll was created to have shrieval authority over Lorn, and the MacDougall lands were merged into the Lordship of the Isles. Though MacDougall authority was restored in 1357, by king David II, the MacDougall heir had 3 years previously, quitclaimed any rights to Mull (including Coll), which therefore remained with the Lord of the Isles.

MacLeans of Coll
 'Altera Merces' translates to "Either shall be my reward" (victory or death)

Foundations

The heirs of the Cenél Loairn were now the MacLeans, who still resided in Lorn, as vassals of the Lord of the Isles. However, the daughter of the first Lord of the Isles, John of Islay, married the leader of the MacLeans, Lachlan Lubanach; subsequent MacLean leaders thus descended from John of Islay. Lachlan's grandson, Lachlan Bronneach had four sons, the eldest of which (Donald) was a bastard, and would thus not inherit the MacLean leadership.

Donald took an armed band to Ardtornish Castle, home of the Lord of the Isles, and demanded that the third Lord of the Isles (Alexander) give him an inheritance, by granting him a share of the lands inherited from John of Islay (on the basis that Donald's grandfather  was Alexander's 1st cousin); Alexander conceded, granting Donald Ardgour and other lands. Having observed this, the youngest son of Lachlan Bronneach - John Garbh - decided to try the same behaviour, and as a result was made laird of Coll, and other lands, by Alexander. King James II confirmed Alexander's grants to John.

John Garbh's heirs became known as the MacLeans of Coll, and constructed Breachacha Castle, on the south coast of Coll, as their base. John Garbh's son John Abraich was killed at the Battle of Corpach defending his Lochaber lands against Clan Cameron. Following his death, all succeeding McLean's of Coll would bear the title 'Mac Iain Abraich' , meaning 'Son of Lochaber John' pronounced and anglicised to 'McEnabrey'. Coll remained home to this branch of the Clan Maclean for 500 years. In 1549 Dean Monro wrote of Coll that it was:
"ane mane fertile Ile inhabite and manurit, with an castell and ane paroch kirk in it, gude for fishing and fowlers, with ane utter fine Falcons nest in it".
He wrote of Rum:
"It pertains to McKenabrey of Coll".

The illustration at right by McIan of 1845, represents Hector McLean 14th Laird of Coll (c1720's) with the infamous 'yellow stick' used to convert the islanders of Rum from Catholicism. Creideamh a bhata bhuidhe.

Feud with the MacLeans of Duart 

At the end of the 15th century, the Lordship of the Isles was dismantled, which made the MacLeans of Coll direct vassals of the crown, which caused conflict with the heirs of the eldest lawful son of Lachlan Bronneach - the Macleans of Duart. The leader of the latter claimed to be leader of all Macleans, as Lachlan Bronneach and his forefathers had been, but the Macleans of Coll argued that their only feudal superior was the king, and they were therefore independent of the Duart branch of the family; essentially the dispute was between feudalism and traditional family leadership principles.

Simmering tensions eventually exploded in 1561, when the MacLeans of Duart invaded the lands of the MacLeans of Coll. The leader of the latter opted to appeal to the Privy Council for assistance; the privy council agreed with the MacLeans of Coll, ordering the MacLeans of Duart to pay reparations. However, in 1583, a decade after succeeding to his position, the new leader of the MacLeans of Duart re-invaded Coll with the intention of taking the island for themselves. A battle was fought at Totronald near Breacachadh Castle where the Coll clan overwhelmed the Duarts, chopped off their heads and threw them in the stream, which is still known as "the stream of the heads".

Feud with the Earl of Argyll 

In the late 17th century, the MacLeans of Duart were in debt to the Earl of Argyll; these stemmed from the civil war when the MacLeans had supported the royalists against the covenanters. Ironically, though himself a royalist, the Earl's father had been one of the most senior covenanters; many therefore felt that the debt was unjust, and in 1676, the MacLeans appealed to the Privy Council, but no decision was reached.

The MacLeans of Coll subsequently supported those of Duart in small guerilla actions against the Earl's lands. Unlike the MacLeans, the Earl was a supporter of the Scottish Reformation, and in 1679 managed to obtain Fire and Sword powers against popery in the Highlands. He launched an attack on Coll, in revenge for the support given to the MacLeans of Duart; Breachacha Castle surrendered on 2 July 1679. However, in 1681, after equivocating over his obedience to king James VII (a Roman Catholic), the Earl was arrested for treason, and Coll was returned to the MacLeans (of Coll).

Departure 

In the late 18th century there were about 1,000 people supported by agriculture and fishing. However, the collapse in the kelp market after the end of the Napoleonic Wars, followed by the Highland Potato Famine, caused a great deal of hardship on the island. By the mid 19th century, half the population had chosen to leave, many of them moving to Australia, Canada, or South Africa.

The obituary of Alexander McLean, 16th of Coll (Alasdair Ruadh):

In 1848, the heir of the Macleans of Coll himself, Alexander Maclean, emigrated to Natal, in South Africa (where he later died, unmarried). In 1856, Alexander's father, Hugh MacLean, decided to sell Coll.

Present day

In the 2011 census, the island's population was recorded as 195, representing an increase over the previous decade of nearly 19% During the same period Scottish island populations as a whole grew by 4% (to 103,702).

Transport

There are only two main roads on Coll. The main hub of the island is the island's largest settlement, Arinagour. Just over a kilometre (0.7 miles) south of Arinagour is the Caledonian MacBrayne ferry terminal. The ferry travels from Oban to Coll to Tiree; and a return trip from Tiree, to Coll, to Oban. The ferry between Oban and Castlebay on Barra goes via Coll and Tiree once a week.

The airport on the island,  is located between Uig and Arileod. Highland Airways who originally operated the route to Oban went into administration in 2010, but a new operator, Hebridean Air Services now operates the route under a PSO with flights to Oban, Tiree and Colonsay. The aircraft used for the flights are a BN2 Islander (G-HEBS). Hebridean headquarters are at Cumbernauld Airport, North Lanarkshire.

Economy

In July 2012, Princess Anne formally opened the Isle of Coll's new community centre, An Cridhe, and hostel, Coll Bunkhouse. Owned and managed by the community-led organisation Development Coll, the new facilities were built to provide much needed amenities on the island and a social hub for the local community.  An Cridhe now hosts a series of annual events such as a half marathon, the Coll Show, a basking shark festival, a bird festival and a chamber music festival, as well as a range of music, comedy, theatre and dance throughout the year.

In December 2013 Coll secured 'dark skies' status, the second location in Scotland. The island has no street lights and little other light pollution, allowing unobstructed views of the night sky on clear nights. In winter the Northern Lights are often visible.

The charity Project Trust, which organises overseas volunteering and gap-years, has been based on the island since 1974. The founder, Nicholas Maclean-Bristol, also restored Breacachadh Castle.

Wildlife

There is an extensive RSPB reserve towards the west end of the island. One of the main attractions is the rare corncrake. Traditional local farming practices have helped this once common British bird to survive.

There is also a small population of sand lizards, as much of 39 individuals were introduced by scientists to test whether they can survive so far north in the 1970s and are still thriving today.

In 2010, a colony of short-necked oil beetles was found on the island. The beetle, thought to be extinct in the UK, is now known only to occur in southern England and Coll. It is parasitic on ground-dwelling bees, and is also flightless, raising the question of how it arrived on the island. It does not appear to be found on neighbouring Tiree, possibly because of a difference in terrain. Modern farming methods had partly caused its demise elsewhere.

In fiction 

Mairi Hedderwick, the illustrator and author, used to live on Coll and has used the island as the setting for her Katie Morag series of children's books. In the books, Coll is known by the fictional name of the Isle of Struay.

In Alexander McCall Smith's The Charming Quirks of Others the protagonist, Isabelle Dalhousie, discusses Coll as a place for a honeymoon.

See also

 List of islands of Scotland
 List of Sites of Special Scientific Interest in Mull, Coll and Tiree
 Cairns of Coll
 Land raid
 Religion of the Yellow Stick

Notes

References

Bibliography
 
 
 Munro, R. W. (1961)Electronic Monro's Western Isles of Scotland and Genealogies of the Clans. Edinburgh and London. Oliver and Boyd.
 Watson, W. J. (1994) The Celtic Place-Names of Scotland. Edinburgh; Birlinn. . First published 1926.

External links

 The island of Coll

 
Islands of the Inner Hebrides
Ramsar sites in Scotland
Special Protection Areas in Scotland
Royal Society for the Protection of Birds reserves in Scotland
Islands of Argyll and Bute